Pun Uk Tsuen, also transliterated as Poon Uk Tsuen, is a village in Yuen Long District, Hong Kong.

Administration
Poon Uk Tsuen is a recognized village under the New Territories Small House Policy.

History
The village was established by the Pun family from Shaoguan in the early 15th century.

References

External links

 Delineation of area of existing village Pun Uk Tsuen (San Tin) for election of resident representative (2019 to 2022)

Villages in Yuen Long District, Hong Kong